Ekaterina Makarova and Elena Vesnina defeated Bethanie Mattek-Sands and Lucie Šafářová in the final, 7–6(7–5), 6–3 to win the doubles tennis title at the 2016 WTA Finals.

Martina Hingis and Sania Mirza were the defending champions, but were defeated in the semifinals by Makarova and Vesnina.

Seeds

  Caroline Garcia /  Kristina Mladenovic (semifinals)
  Martina Hingis /  Sania Mirza (semifinals)
  Bethanie Mattek-Sands /  Lucie Šafářová (final)
  Ekaterina Makarova /  Elena Vesnina (champions)
  Andrea Hlaváčková /  Lucie Hradecká (quarterfinals)
  Chan Hao-ching /  Chan Yung-jan (quarterfinals)
  Tímea Babos /  Yaroslava Shvedova (quarterfinals)
  Julia Görges /  Karolína Plíšková (quarterfinals)

Draw

Draw

References
 Main Draw

2016 Doubles